GP Comae Berenices, abbreviated to GP Com and also known as G 61-29, is a star system composed of a white dwarf orbited by a planetary mass object, likely the highly eroded core of another white dwarf star. The white dwarf is slowly accreting material from its satellite at a rate of /year and was proven to be a low-activity AM CVn star. The star system is showing signs of a high abundance of ionized nitrogen from the accretion disk around the primary.

Planetary system
The material emitted from the planetary mass companion is mostly helium, with a molar ratio of nitrogen up to 1.7%, very low neon levels and other elements not detectable at all. Approximately half of the luminosity of the system comes from the accretion disk. The planetary object is suspected to contain a strange quark matter core due to its unusually high density, which must be above  to prevent tidal disruption. The object's orbit is expected to decay within 100 million years due to gravitational wave emission.

References 

Planetary systems with one confirmed planet
Coma Berenices
J13054243+1801039
Comae Berenices, GP
AM CVn stars
White dwarfs